Ahmet Akçan (born 17 February 1958) is a Turkish football coach.

He worked as the assistant of Karl-Heinz Feldkamp when Feldkamp managed Galatasaray SK and Beşiktaş JK. He managed Karabükspor, Bursaspor, Mardinspor and Eskişehirspor.

References

External links
Manager profile at TFF.org
Ahmet Akçan manager stats in Turkey at mackolik.com

1958 births
Living people
Turkish football managers
Mardinspor managers
Bursaspor managers
Galatasaray S.K. (football) non-playing staff